King-Lebel is a designated place in the Canadian province of Ontario, located in the Timiskaming District. The community, located between the town of Kirkland Lake and the municipal township of Gauthier, consists of the unincorporated township of Lebel, whose primary settlement is the community of King Kirkland.

Services in the township are provided by a local services board.

The community is considered part of Timiskaming, Unorganized, West Part.

Demographics 

References

Communities in Timiskaming District
Designated places in Ontario
Local services boards in Ontario